is a Japanese manga artist. He is best known for his fantasy series The Seven Deadly Sins (2012–2020), which has over 37 million copies in circulation. He began a sequel, Four Knights of the Apocalypse, in 2021.

Life and career
The first manga series Suzuki ever bought was Dr. Slump by Akira Toriyama. In elementary and junior high school, he was a fan of Kinnikuman, Fist of the North Star, and Dragon Ball. Suzuki made his professional debut in 1994 with the story "Revenge", which was an honorable mention for Shueisha's Hop Step Award. His first series, Rising Impact, was serialized in Shueisha's Weekly Shōnen Jump from 1998 to 2002. From 2007 to 2010, he serialized Kongō Banchō in Shogakukan's Weekly Shōnen Sunday.

Suzuki serialized The Seven Deadly Sins in Kodansha's Weekly Shōnen Magazine from 2012 to 2020. It won the 39th Kodansha Manga Award for Best Shōnen Manga alongside Yowamushi Pedal, and had over 37 million copies in circulation as of March 2020. The series has spawned a large media franchise including several spin-off manga, novels, an anime television series, and video games. Suzuki provided original stories to serve as the basis to two animated film adaptations, Prisoners of the Sky and Cursed by Light. In January 2021, Suzuki began Four Knights of the Apocalypse as a sequel to The Seven Deadly Sins.

Works 
  (1998–2002) (Weekly Shōnen Jump)
 Ultra Red (2002–2003) (Weekly Shōnen Jump)
  (2004–2006) (Ultra Jump)
  (2005–2007) (Weekly Shōnen Sunday)
  (2007–2010) (Weekly Shōnen Sunday)
  (2012–2020) (Weekly Shōnen Magazine)
  (2021–present) (Weekly Shōnen Magazine)

References

External links
Nakaba Suzuki's blog
 

1977 births
Living people
Manga artists from Fukushima Prefecture
Winner of Kodansha Manga Award (Shōnen)
The Seven Deadly Sins
People from Sukagawa